A list of films produced in Spain in 1964 (see 1964 in film).

1964

Notes

References

External links
 Spanish films of 1964 at the Internet Movie Database

1964
Spanish
Films